The Sri Lanka Navy 25th Anniversary Medal (Sinhala: ශ්‍රී ලංකා නාවික හමුදා 25වන සංවත්සර පදක්කම Śrī Laṃkā nāvika hamudā visipasvana sangwathsara padakkama) was awarded to all ranks of both the regular- and volunteer forces of the Sri Lanka Navy, as well as civilians employed within the Navy who have completed a minimum of ten years of service by any time point within the 9 December 1974 to 8 December 1975 period, the year of the 25th anniversary of the Navy.

References

External links
Sri Lanka Navy
Ministry of Defence : Sri Lanka

See also
 Sri Lanka Navy 50th Anniversary Medal

Military awards and decorations of Sri Lanka
Awards established in 1975